Jhunjhunwala is an Indian toponymic Marwari surname from Jhunjhunu in Rajasthan, India. They belong to Marwari community hailing from Rajasthan. Jhunjhunwalas follow Marwari traditions and are pure vegetarian community. Dialect that can be commonly heard by people belonging to this town is Marwari.They are the worshippers of deity Rani Sati in Jhunjhunu in Rajasthan.

Vice President of India (2022) belongs to Jhunjhunu in Rajasthan.
Jagdeep Dhankhar (born 18 May 1951) is an Indian politician and lawyer, who is serving as the 14th and current vice president of India, since 11 August 2022. Prior to serving in this position, he served as the Governor of West Bengal. He also held office as the Union Minister for Parliamentary Affairs under the  Chandra Shekhar ministry in 1990. He is a member of the Bharatiya Janata Party. 

It may refer to:
Rakesh Jhunjhunwala (1960–2022) - Indian investor and trader, founder of Akasa Air, often referred to as "India's Warren Buffett"
Abhishek Jhunjhunwala (born 1982) - Indian cricketer
Ashok Jhunjhunwala (born 1953) - Indian electrical engineer
Banarsi Prasad Jhunjhunwala (1888–1966) - Indian politician

See also
Ramniranjan Jhunjhunwala College of Arts, Science & Commerce in Mumbai, India
 Jhunjhunu

Indian surnames
Surnames of Indian origin
Surnames of Hindustani origin
Hindu surnames
Toponymic surnames
People from Jhunjhunu district